Jocelyn Charles Bjorn Lovell (19 July 1950 – 3 June 2016) was a Canadian cyclist. He won dozens of Canadian national titles for track and road cycling in the 1970s and early 1980s, as well as gold medals at the Commonwealth Games and Pan American Games. He competed at three Olympic Games. His victories, at international competitions, renewed global interest in Canadian cycling.

At the 1978 Commonwealth Games in Edmonton, he won three gold medals in Games record times. Later that year he won a silver medal at the world championships.

He continued to race as an amateur into the early 1980s.

On 4 August 1983, he was hit by a dump truck while training in Halton Region, just northwest of Toronto. The driver drove into him from behind, breaking Lovell's neck and pelvis. From that moment on, he permanently became quadriplegic. No charges were laid. In 1985, he was inducted into the Canadian Sports Hall of Fame.

Personal life
Lovell was born in Norwich, England in 1950. He moved with his family to Canada in 1954. He started cycle racing when he was 13.

Lovell was married to speed skater and competitive cyclist Sylvia Burka in 1981. They separated in 1986. He lived in Mississauga, Ontario with his second wife, Neil. He died in Toronto on Friday, 3 June 2016.

Citations

References

External links
 

1950 births
2016 deaths
Canadian male cyclists
Cyclists at the 1968 Summer Olympics
Cyclists at the 1972 Summer Olympics
Cyclists at the 1976 Summer Olympics
Cyclists at the 1975 Pan American Games
Cyclists at the 1970 British Commonwealth Games
Olympic cyclists of Canada
Cyclists at the 1978 Commonwealth Games
Commonwealth Games gold medallists for Canada
Sportspeople from Norwich
People with tetraplegia
Commonwealth Games medallists in cycling
Pan American Games medalists in cycling
Pan American Games gold medalists for Canada
Medalists at the 1975 Pan American Games
20th-century Canadian people
Medallists at the 1970 British Commonwealth Games
Medallists at the 1978 Commonwealth Games